Wilmer C. Butler ASC (born April 7, 1921) is an American former cinematographer. He is known for his work on The Conversation (1974), Jaws (1975), and three Rocky sequels. Butler also completed One Flew Over the Cuckoo's Nest (1975) after Haskell Wexler was fired from the production, and was subsequently nominated for an Academy Award for Best Cinematography.

Early life and education
Wilmer C. Butler was born on April 7, 1921, in Cripple Creek, Colorado. Butler spent the first five years of his life living in a log cabin on a homestead in Colorado, where his parents were farmers. He moved with his parents to Henry County when he was 5 years old and raised in Mount Pleasant, Iowa, a small college town. He graduated from Mount Pleasant High School in 1940.

He graduated with a degree in engineering from the University of Iowa.

Early career
Butler began his career as an engineer at a radio station in Gary, Indiana. He subsequently moved to Chicago, where he helped design and build the first television stations at the ABC affiliate and later at WGN-TV. When WGN went on the air, Butler operated a live video camera for commercials and for locally produced programs. At his tenure with WGN, Butler met William Friedkin.

Friedkin asked Butler to be his cinematographer on The People vs. Paul Crump, a documentary that focused on a prisoner who was slated for execution in Illinois. It was a docudrama that resulted in the governor of Illinois' commuting the prisoner's death sentence. "I was very successful in television, so I had no reason to go into film," Butler said. "But I knew Bill Friedkin was interested in making a film documentary, and he needed a cinematographer. He asked me to assist him. And I did." As a result, Butler's interest shifted from live television to film documentaries. In a 2005 interview, Butler credited Friedkin for giving him his first actual job in the film industry.

Cinematography
Butler earned his first narrative credit in Chicago in 1967 for Fearless Frank, a low-budget feature directed by Philip Kaufman. Two years later, Butler shot The Rain People (1969) for Francis Ford Coppola, who was introduced to him by Friedkin. Butler moved to Los Angeles in 1970.

"I did some work with director Phil Kaufman on the Universal Studios lot as a writer while I was still trying to get into the Los Angeles camera guild," Butler recalls. "That's when I met Steven Spielberg." Butler would then take charge of cinematography for two of Spielberg's earliest films, Something Evil (1972) and Savage (1973).

Other films which Butler served as the director of photography include The Bingo Long Traveling All-Stars & Motor Kings (1976), Grease (1978) and installments two, three, and four of Rocky. Butler was also the cinematographer for Demon Seed (1977), as well as Capricorn One (1978), Stripes (1981), Biloxi Blues (1988), Child's Play (1988), Graffiti Bridge (1990), Flipper (1996), Anaconda (1997) and Deceiver (1997). His television credits include The Execution of Private Slovik (1974) and The Thorn Birds (1983).

Butler was scheduled to have made his directorial debut in January 1979 with Adrift & Beyond, but it never came to fruition. Butler turned down Coppola's offer to direct the photography for Apocalypse Now (1979). Butler has worked in films during the 2000s, such as Frailty (2002) and Funny Money (2006). Bill Paxton, the director of the former film, said, "I was excited when Bill Butler who was the cinematographer on such classic films as Jaws and The Conversation came aboard as my director of photography for Frailty. And I really picked his brain, always asking 'how did you do this shot?' and 'how did you figure that out?'" Bill Butler recounts his initial conversations with Paxton about the script: "I liked the direction he wanted to take, and he inspired me to share his vision. It was a great collaboration."

Butler is also notable for being a replacement to Haskell Wexler on two occasions: The Conversation (1974; also directed by Coppola) and One Flew Over the Cuckoo's Nest (1975).

Jaws
Butler had heard that Spielberg was preparing to shoot Jaws (1975), mainly on Martha's Vineyard in Massachusetts. "I said, 'I hear you're making a movie about a fish,'" Butler recalls. After they joked for a few minutes, Spielberg asked Butler if he was interested.

Butler's crew included Michael Chapman as camera operator. When they arrived on Martha's Vineyard, Butler showed Spielberg how he could brace a handheld Panaflex camera and take the roll out of the boat rocking on the waves with his knees instead of using a 400-lb gimbal. Spielberg embraced the idea. "About 90% of the shots on the boat were handheld," Butler says. "Michael was intrigued by the idea and was very good at it. We did things that we probably wouldn't have tried without the lightweight camera. Michael even climbed the mast and shot from the top straight down. We also put him in a small boat."

During the production of Jaws, Butler spent most of his time on the picture in the water with Spielberg. Butler created a special camera platform that worked with the water to accommodate both "below the water line" and "surface" shots quickly. To handle the longer surface shots the film required, Butler reconfigured the standard "water box" casing used to hold a camera in the water. He also is acknowledged for saving footage from a camera that sank into the ocean, having claimed sea water is similar to saline-based developing solutions. "We got on an airplane with the film in a bucket of water, took it to New York and developed it. We didn't lose a foot," said Butler.

Butler also created a pontoon camera raft with a waterproof housing that achieved those trademark water level shots that gave a point of view from the shark fin. To stop water drops hitting the lens, Butler used the Panavision Spray Deflector that saw an optical glass spin at high speed to deflect the drops except for the 4th of July beach stampede where the water-lens interface adds to the panic.

Butler originally envisioned the look of Jaws to start in bright, summer sunshine and then become more ominous as the shark hunt goes on. The first half remains a riot of vibrant primary colors. In filming Amity, Butler was inspired by the work of painters such as Edward Hopper and Andrew Wyeth in their view of the United States untainted by urban life.

Awards, nominations, and honors
Butler was nominated for an Academy Award (which he shared with Wexler) and a BAFTA Film Award for his work in One Flew Over the Cuckoo's Nest (1975). He won Primetime Emmy Awards for Raid on Entebbe (1977) and A Streetcar Named Desire (1984).

On February 16, 2003, Butler received the American Society of Cinematographers Lifetime Achievement Award. His memorable and influential work on Jaws is one of the many reasons the ASC honored him with the award, and Spielberg wrote a letter to Butler acknowledging his award which indicated the director's mutual respect for Butler and his work behind the camera. "You were the calm before, during and after every storm on the set of Jaws," Spielberg wrote in the letter. "Without your zen-like confidence and wonderful sense of humor, I would have gone the way of the rest of the Jaws crew — totally out of my friggin' mind. Congratulations on this well-deserved career achievement award from your peers. All my best, Steven."

Butler also was named KODAK Cinematographer in Residence at the University of Arizona (Department of Media Arts) in 2006.

On April 28, 2013, the Charleston International Film Festival presented Butler with the festival's inaugural lifetime achievement award.

Personal life
Butler resides in Montana. On June 1, 2014, Butler returned to his hometown of Mount Pleasant for a reception honoring his career.

Butler has five daughters, three from his first marriage to Alma H. Smith, and two, Genevieve and Chelsea, who are both actresses, from his second marriage to Iris Butler.

He turned 100 on April 7, 2021.

Filmography

Films

Television

References

External links
 
 Bill Butler (cinematographer) on JAWS on YouTube

1921 births
Living people
American cinematographers
American centenarians
Men centenarians
People from Cripple Creek, Colorado
People from Mount Pleasant, Iowa
University of Iowa alumni